Benjamin Charles Watson, sometimes credited as Ben Watson, is a Canadian actor. He is most noted for his role as Dontae Evans in the third season of the television series Designated Survivor, and his performance in the web series I Am Syd Stone.

Early life 
Born in Jamaica, Watson moved to Toronto, Ontario with his family at age 10.

Career 
He acted in supporting film and television roles, most notably in the television drama series Soul, before landing his first major starring role in the television series The L.A. Complex. Watson was a Canadian Screen Award nominee for Best Supporting Performance in a Web Program or Series at the 10th Canadian Screen Awards in 2022 for I Am Syd Stone.

Personal life 
He publicly came out as queer in 2019.

Filmography

Film

Television

References

External links

21st-century Canadian male actors
Canadian male film actors
Canadian male television actors
Canadian male web series actors
Black Canadian male actors
Black Canadian LGBT people
Canadian LGBT actors
Jamaican emigrants to Canada
Male actors from Toronto
Living people
1985 births
21st-century Canadian LGBT people